The 1993–94 Druga HNL (also known as 2. HNL) season was the 3rd season of Croatia's second level football since its establishment in 1992. The league was contested in two regional groups (North Division and South Division), with 16 clubs each.

North Division

South Division

See also
1993–94 Prva HNL
1993–94 Croatian Cup

External links
1993–94 in Croatian Football at Rec.Sport.Soccer Statistics Foundation
Official website  

First Football League (Croatia) seasons
Druga HNL
Cro